are a Japanese heavy metal band from Osaka, who released their first album in 1999.

History
They play quite orthodox heavy metal music, mixed with elements from Japanese folk and pop music, and play both fast, hard songs and slow ballads. Since their debut in 1999, they have appeared in traditional clothing characteristic of Japan's Heian period.

Their name refers to Onmyōdō and the gathering of yin and yang (Inyo in Japanese, formerly Onmyō), and the theme of opposites and cosmic dual forces are prevalent in their lyrics. This contrast is also represented by the female and male vocals and two guitarists.

Band members 
 Matatabi - bass, vocals, leader, lyrics, composer
 Kuroneko - vocals, lyrics
 Maneki - guitar, backing vocals
 Karukan - guitar

Support members
 Dobashi Makoto - drums, percussion
 Abe Masahiro - keyboards

Former members
 Atsushi "Tora" Kawatsuka - drums, percussion (1999–2009)

Stage names 
Each of the band member's stage names feature a double entendre with a sense of humor and make references to cats.

 Matatabi (瞬火) means "flash fire", but it can also be read as silver vine (loved by cats, similar to catnip).
 Kuroneko (黒猫) literally means "black cat", just symbolizing her personality.
 Maneki (招鬼) practically means "summoning oni", but see also maneki neko.
 Karukan (狩姦) is unclear. Karu (狩) independently means "attacking"/"hunting" and Kan (姦) is "adultery". The kanji 姦 and 奸, (the latter now meaning "wickedness") were the same in old times but have been changed. But it is also a brand of cat food.
 Tora (斗羅) It's pronounced like the word "tiger", but its reading is the same as tabby. It also refers to him being a Hanshin Tigers fan.

Influences 
Musically Matatabi was influenced by heavy metal bands such as Judas Priest, Annihilator and Destruction, and by Rush. Osamu Tezuka and Futaro Yamada had a significant influence on him. Matatabi also hailed Ningen Isu as the precedent playing heavy metal and singing in Japanese. Kuroneko said she respects Ronnie James Dio as her eternal goal. In addition to that, her inspirations included Kenji Miyazawa and Zdzisław Beksiński. Karukan cites Jason Becker, Maneki and Paul Gilbert as his main influences. He practiced songs by "Shrapnel" Artists back in the day such as Jason Becker, Richie Kotzen, Greg Howe and so on, and covered Megadeth's songs along with Maneki. Maneki listed Gary Moore's "Blues Alive" as his favorite album.

Themes and inspiration 
Their songs mainly deal with Japanese folklore, such as the oni, yōkai, and the dragons. However, some songs have more concrete themes and inspirations. For example, Onmyo-za have composed twelve songs related to "Ninpocho", or "ninja scrolls". These songs are a tribute to author Futaro Yamada and his ōchō  series. The band's hit song, "Koga Ninpocho", was written for the Studio Gonzo TV animated series Basilisk, which was based on Yamada's novel, The Kouga Ninja Scrolls.

There are also some other songs inspired by Osamu Tezuka and Natsuhiko Kyogoku, and the Kumikyoku Yoshitsune trilogy is based on the legend of Japanese ancient tragic hero Minamoto no Yoshitsune. "Soukoku/Doukoku" was written for the Nintendo DS game The Inugami Clan which was based on Seishi Yokomizo's novel The Inugami Clan. "Aoki Dokugan" was written for the pachinko machine "CR Sengoku-ranbu Aoki Dokugan" which is based on the story of Date Masamune, a famous daimyō.

Discography

Albums

Compilations

Singles

Live Performances

References

External links 
 

Gan-Shin artists
Japanese heavy metal musical groups
Japanese power metal musical groups
Japanese symphonic metal musical groups
Folk metal musical groups
Musical groups from Osaka
Musical groups established in 1999
Japanese mythology in music
1999 establishments in Japan
Female-fronted musical groups